Johann Kaspar von Stadion (21 December 1567 – 21 November 1641) was the 45th Grandmaster of the Teutonic Order.

References

Grand Masters of the Teutonic Order
1567 births
1641 deaths
Nationality missing